The 1919 South Carolina 6th congressional district special election was held on October 7, 1919, to select a Representative for the 6th congressional district to serve out the remainder of the term for the 66th Congress.  The special election resulted from the death of Representative J. Willard Ragsdale on July 23, 1919. Philip H. Stoll, a former solicitor and World War I veteran, won the Democratic primary and was unopposed in the general election.

Democratic primary
The South Carolina Democratic Party held their primary in the summer of 1919 and six candidates entered the race.  E.J. Sherwood emerged atop the first primary election on August 26, but was defeated in the runoff election by Philip H. Stoll on September 9.  There was no opposition to the Democratic candidate in the general election so Stoll was elected to serve out the remainder of the term.

General election results

|-
| 
| colspan=5 |Democratic hold
|-

See also
South Carolina's 6th congressional district
1919 South Carolina's 7th congressional district special election
List of special elections to the United States House of Representatives in South Carolina

References

"Report of the Secretary of State to the General Assembly of South Carolina.  Part II." Reports of State Officers Boards and Committees to the General Assembly of the State of South Carolina. Volume II. Columbia, SC: 1920, p. 4.

South Carolina 1919 06
South Carolina 1919 06
1919 06
South Carolina 06
United States House of Representatives 06
United States House of Representatives 1919 06
Single-candidate elections